Fakhreddine Galbi (born 14 August 1984, in Korba) is a Tunisian football (soccer) player who currently plays as a striker for CA Bizertin.

Career 
Galbi began his career in his hometown with CS Korba and was promoted 2004 to the senior side, before moved in summer 2006 to Union Sportive Monastir. On 26 August 2008 he moved from Union Sportive Monastir to Liechtenstein club FC Vaduz (playing in the Swiss league system) and signed a contract to 30 June 2010. After just one year was released from his contract with Vaduz and returned back to Tunisia, signing for Stade Tunisien on 23 August 2009.

International career 
He has one cap for Tunisia and five youth games.

References 

Tunisian footballers
FC Vaduz players
Tunisia international footballers
Association football forwards
1984 births
Living people
Tunisian expatriate footballers
Expatriate footballers in Liechtenstein
Expatriate footballers in Egypt
CS Korba players
US Monastir (football) players
Stade Tunisien players
CS Sfaxien players
Al Mokawloon Al Arab SC players
Stade Gabèsien players
CA Bizertin players
Tunisian expatriate sportspeople in Liechtenstein
Tunisian expatriate sportspeople in Egypt
Tunisia youth international footballers